Katja Hose is a professor of computer science at Aalborg University.

Education 
In 2004, Katja Hose completed her master's degree in computer science at the Ilmenau University of Technology in Germany. In 2009 she received her PhD in computer science - also from Ilmenau University of Technology.

Career 
Since 2012, Katja Hose has been affiliated with Aalborg University. In 2018, she was appointed as a professor in computer science after having received a grant from the Poul Due Jensen Foundation. Katja Hose researches web science and is involved in the fields of big data, machine learning, and semantic technology.
 
Her research is based on examining vast amounts of open data which has not been used in prior research. By doing so, this method of research is able to provide her results with more accurate and reliable information.
 
Furthermore, her work is targeted at creating the best possible conditions for fact-checking by enabling machines to automatically find, process and interpret information. Thereby, this technology functions somewhat like a personal digital assistant, however, Hose's research will be based on data available to the public and will not be bound to a specific corporation or service provider.

Grants 
Katja Hose is a recipient of a YDUN grant and the Sapere Aude grant from Independent Research Fund Denmark.

References 

Danish women computer scientists
Danish computer scientists
Academic staff of Aalborg University
Living people
1980 births